Finn Hugo Bernhoft (February 6, 1898 – April 27, 1981) was a Norwegian theater and film actor.

Bernhoft was born in Kristiania (now Oslo), Norway. He debuted in 1917 in Edvard Drabløs's touring theater, and he started working with the Trondheim National Theater that same year. He later played at Chat Noir, the Carl Johan Theater, and the Central Theater, and from 1948 to 1958 he was engaged with the Trøndelag Theater. In addition to many roles in comedies, operettas, and musicals, he won acclaim as Morten Kiil in Henrik Ibsen's An Enemy of the People and as the riding master in August Strindberg's The Father.

In film, Bernhoft had almost 30 supporting roles over a period of 40 years. He made his film debut in 1929 in the Norwegian silent film Laila. After that he appeared in Fantegutten (1932), Skjærgårdsflirt (1932), Bør Børson Jr. (1938), Gategutter (1949), Pappa tar gull (1964), and An-Magritt (1969), which was his last film role. He also appeared in some performances on NRK's Television Theater, including Går ut i kveld (1961) and Læraren (1963).

Bernhoft lived in Slependen.

Filmography

 1929: Laila as C.O. Lind, a trader
 1930: Eskimo as the helmsman
 1931: Den store barnedåpen
 1932: Fantegutten as Bottolf
 1932: Prinsessen som ingen kunne målbinde as Fenriken
 1932: Skjærgårdsflirt as Andersen, a wholesaler
 1936: Morderen uten ansikt as Hansen, a manager
 1936: Norge for folket
 1937: Bra mennesker as the sheriff
 1937: Laila as Lind, a trader
 1938: Bør Børson Jr. as Jens, a smallholder
 1938: Det drønner gjennom dalen as a forest worker
 1939: De vergeløse as the sheriff
 1941: Gullfjellet as Jon
 1942: Det æ'kke te å tru as Pedersen
 1942: Den farlige leken
 1946: Om kjærligheten synger de
 1948: Dit vindarna bär as a farmer
 1948: Kampen om tungtvannet
 1949: Gategutter as Reidar's father
 1952: Vi vil skilles as the mover
 1960: Det store varpet 
 1962: Tonny
 1963: Freske fraspark
 1964: Pappa tar gull as Muggen
 1966: Broder Gabrielsen as Andersen
 1969: An-Magritt as the sheriff

Television 

 1961: Går ut i kveld as the bartender in the coffee shop
 1963: Læraren

References

External links
 
 Finn Bernhoft at the Swedish Film Database
 Finn Bernhoft at the Danish Film Database
 Finn Bernhoft at Sceneweb
 Finn Bernhoft at Filmfront

1898 births
1981 deaths
Norwegian male stage actors
Norwegian male film actors
Norwegian male television actors
20th-century Norwegian male actors